Edward Liddall Armitage or E. Liddall Armitage (1887–1967) was an English stained-glass designer. He studied and worked with Karl Parsons and Henry Holiday before going into partnership with Victor Drury. In the 1940s to the early 1960s, Armitage was the chief stained glass designer for James Powell and Sons. During his career he designed and made stained glass works for churches and cathedrals. He also published a book on making stained glass.

Education and career
Armitage studied under Karl Parsons and from 1920 to 1924 was his assistant stained glass painter. He also studied under Henry Holiday. After Holiday died in 1927, Armitage finished some of Holiday's work that was in progress. Like Holiday and Parsons, Armitage worked at The Glass House (Fulham).

He was a partner to Victor Drury of Lowndes and Drury of The Glass House (Fulham) studio in the 1920s. Starting in 1930, Armitage worked as a stained glass artist at 43-45 Blenheim Crescent in North Kensington in London. He joined James Powell and Sons, Whitefriars Ltd in 1950.

He published a book title Stained glass: history, technology and practice.

Works
The partial list of Armitage's works are sorted by church name:
 Virgin and Child with Christ the Good Shepherd, about 1940, Church of St Brynach, Nevern, Pembrokeshire
 Moses and King David from Figures from the Old and New Testaments, about 1958-1959, Church of St Mary, Swansea (for James Powell and Sons)
 Christ with the Four Evangelists, about 1959, Church of St Mary, Swansea
 Scenes from the Life of the Virgin Mary, 1960, Church of St Mary, Swansea (designed with Marjorie Walters, for James Power and Sons)
 Slinfold
 St Bartholomew's Church, Marsden, Huddersfield
 Descent of the Holy Dove, and Ascension of Christ, 1964, St George, Headstone, Harrow

 St Mark's Church, Bromley is a stained glass work with multiple panels. 'Go Ye Into All The World And Preach The Gospel To Every Creature' is the inscription for the three featured bishops.
 Air Force windows, St Paul's Church in Wellington. Members of the Service gave the windows.
 St Peter Church, Chailey
 St Thomas's Episcopal Church, Fifth Avenue, New York
 West Dean
 West Itchenor

Publications
 Edward Liddall Armitage. (1959). Stained glass: history, technology and practice. C. T. Branford Company.

References

Further reading
 Joyce Little. (2002). Stained Glass Marks and Monograms.. London: National Association of Decorative and Fine Art Societies. p. 4. ASIN: B0035XD4TS (spiral bound book)

External links
Images
 Saint George and Saint Andrew by Edward Liddall Armitage at St Mary the Virgin, Leake, Yorkshire
 Images of Armitage's works
 Image of Armitage himself
Video
 Stained Glass Windows (1955) Armitage in the beginning of the video
Overview
 Overview of Stained Glass Plating, based upon Armitage's approach

English stained glass artists and manufacturers
1887 births
1967 deaths